Salama is Okay or Salama is Safe (and sometimes Everything Is Fine) (translit. Salama fi Khayr) is a film created in 1937. The film is a comedy by the inexhaustible Egyptian director Naizi Mostafa (74 films to his name), written by, and starring, the famous actor, Naguib el-Rihani. Salama is Okay is a member in the Top 100 Egyptian films list.

Synopsis 
Salama, head porter at a large fabric store, and the most honest man in Cairo, is accused of having stolen money after a series of misfortunate incidents. Luckily, “Salam’s okay”.

References 

 
 

1937 films
Egyptian black-and-white films
Egyptian romantic comedy-drama films
1930s romantic comedy-drama films
1937 comedy films
1937 drama films